The Straitsman was a Bass Strait 720-ton roll-on/roll-off ferry livestock carrier which capsized and sank in the Yarra River, Melbourne, Australia on 23 March 1974 while approaching her berth with her vehicle door partly open, with the loss of two crew members and many of her cargo of 2,000 sheep. The ferry was heading upstream at  when a crew member opened the stern door without the knowledge of the captain on the bridge.

Following salvage and repair, the vessel spent 15 years serving King Island, before being bought by Bluebridge, where it provided inter-island ferry services between the North and South Islands between 1992 and 2004. It was then sold to a Fijian shpping company, re-named Sinu-I-Wasa, running aground during Cyclone Winston in 2016.

References

Further reading 

1972 ships
Ferries
Maritime incidents in 1974
Maritime incidents in 2016
Shipwrecks of Victoria (Australia)